Velvet Goldmine is a 1998 musical drama film written and directed by Todd Haynes from a story by Haynes and James Lyons. It is set in Britain during the glam rock days of the early 1970s, and tells the story of fictional bisexual pop star Brian Slade, who faked his own death. The film was nominated for the Palme d'Or at the 1998 Cannes Film Festival and won the award for the Best Artistic Contribution. Sandy Powell received a BAFTA Award for Best Costume Design and was nominated for an Academy Award for Best Costume Design. The film utilizes non-linear storytelling to achieve exposition while interweaving the vignettes of its various characters.

Plot
In 1984, British journalist Arthur Stuart is writing an article about the withdrawal from public life of 1970s glam rock star Brian Slade following a death hoax ten years earlier, and is interviewing those who had a part in the entertainer's career. As each person recalls their thoughts, it becomes the introduction of the vignette for that particular segment in Slade's personal and professional life.

Part of the story involves Stuart's family's reaction to his homosexuality, and how the gay and bisexual glam rock stars and music scene gave him the strength to come out. Rock shows, fashion, and rock journalism all play a role in showing the youth culture of 1970s Britain, as well as the gay culture of the time. At the beginning of his career, Slade is married to Mandy. When he comes to the United States, he seeks out American rock star Curt Wild, and they become involved in each other's lives.

The vignettes show Wild and Slade becoming increasingly difficult to work with as they become more famous. They suffer breakdowns in their personal and professional relationships. Eventually, Slade's career ends following the critical and fan backlash from his on-stage publicity stunt where he faked his own murder.

As he gets closer to the truth of where Slade is now, Stuart is suddenly told by his editor that the story is no longer of public interest and Stuart has been assigned to the Tommy Stone tour, which coincidentally is Brian Slade's new identity. We discover Stuart was also at the concert where Slade faked his own death, and that after seeing Wild perform on another night, Wild and Stuart had a sexual encounter.

Eventually, Stuart confronts Tommy Stone and once again encounters Wild, who casually passes on a piece of jewellry from Oscar Wilde.

Cast

 Ewan McGregor as Curt Wild 
 Christian Bale as Arthur Stuart
 Jonathan Rhys Meyers as Brian Slade
 Toni Collette as Mandy Slade
 Eddie Izzard as Jerry Devine 
 Micko Westmoreland as Jack Fairy 
 Alastair Cumming as Tommy Stone
 Emily Woof as Shannon
 Joseph Beattie as Cooper
 Michael Feast as Cecil
 Lindsay Kemp as Pantomime Dame
 Janet McTeer as Female Narrator
 Carlos Miranda as Pianist
 Sarah Cawood as Angel
 David Hoyle as Freddi

Production
The film centers on Brian Slade, a bisexual and androgynous glam rock icon who was patterned after David Bowie, Bryan Ferry, Jobriath and Marc Bolan. Director Todd Haynes requested access to Bowie's song catalogue along with a personal blessing to make the film, but Bowie refused, saying that he intended to make a similar film about the time.  Ewan McGregor co-stars in the role of Curt Wild, a genre-defying performer who doesn't back down from sex, nudity or drugs on or off stage and whose biographical details are based on Iggy Pop (who grew up in a trailer park) and Lou Reed (whose parents sent him to electroshock therapy to 'cure' his homosexual feelings). Also featured are Christian Bale as the young glam rock fan and reporter, Arthur Stuart and Toni Collette as Slade's wife, Mandy, who is based on Bowie's first wife, Angela. Eddie Izzard stars as Slade's manager, Jerry Devine.

The tale strongly parallels Bowie's relationships with Reed and Pop in the 1970s and 1980s. Brian Slade's gradually overwhelming stage persona of "Maxwell Demon" and his backing band, "Venus in Furs", resemble Bowie's persona and backing band. The album Ziggy Stardust and the Spiders from Mars tells a similar story of a rock star gone over the edge and culminates in his assassination. As with Slade and Wild, Bowie produced records for and with, Pop and Reed. The band name "Venus in Furs" is taken from a song by Lou Reed's early band, the Velvet Underground, which was taken from Leopold von Sacher-Masoch's eponymous novel, which appeared on their first album. Maxwell Demon was the name of an early band of Brian Eno, a long-time Bowie associate, whose music is heard at various points in the film.

Haynes has said that the story is also about the love affair between America and Britain, New York City and London, in the way each music scene feeds off and influences each other. Little Richard is shown as an early influence on Brian Slade. Little Richard inspired the Beatles and Bowie, who in turn inspired many other bands. Little Richard has also been cited by Haynes as the inspiration for Jack Fairy.

The film is strongly influenced by the ideas and life of Oscar Wilde (seen in the film as a progenitor of glam rock), and refers to events in his life and quotes his work on dozens of occasions. Jean Genet (the subject of Haynes' previous film, Poison, and the putative inspiration for the title of Bowie's song "The Jean Genie") is referred to in imagery and also quoted in dialogue.

The film's narrative structure is modelled on that of Orson Welles' Citizen Kane, in that the reporter Stuart tries to solve a mystery about Slade, travelling to interview Slade's lovers and colleagues, whose recollections are shown in 1950s, 1960s and 1970s flashbacks.

David Bowie was ambivalent about Velvet Goldmine upon release. According to Bowie, "When I saw the film I thought the best thing about it was the gay scenes. They were the only successful part of the film, frankly."

Soundtrack

Although the character of Brian Slade is heavily based on David Bowie, Bowie vetoed the proposal that his songs appear in the film. However, as producer of Lou Reed's 1972 Transformer album, his backing vocals (mainly consisting of "bum-bum-bum"s and "ooh-ooh"s) can be heard on "Satellite of Love".

The finished soundtrack includes songs by glam rock and glam-influenced bands, past and present.

The English musicians who played under the name The Venus in Furs on the soundtrack were Radiohead's Thom Yorke and Jonny Greenwood, David Gray Band's Clune, Suede's Bernard Butler, and Roxy Music's Andy Mackay. The American musicians who played as Curt Wild's Wylde Ratttz on the soundtrack were The Stooges' Ron Asheton, Sonic Youth's Thurston Moore and Steve Shelley, Minutemen's Mike Watt, Gumball's Don Fleming, and Mark Arm of Mudhoney.

The soundtrack features new songs written for the film by Pulp, Shudder to Think and Grant Lee Buffalo, as well as many early glam rock compositions, both covers and original versions. The Venus in Furs covers several Roxy Music songs with Thom Yorke channeling Bryan Ferry on vocals, Placebo covers T. Rex's "20th Century Boy," Wylde Ratttz and Ewan McGregor cover The Stooges' "T.V. Eye" and "Gimme Danger", and Teenage Fanclub and Donna Matthews cover the New York Dolls' "Personality Crisis". Lou Reed, Brian Eno, T. Rex, and Steve Harley songs from the period are also included. The album is rounded out by a piece of Carter Burwell's score.

All three members of the band Placebo also appeared in the film, with Brian Molko and Steve Hewitt playing members of the Flaming Creatures (Malcolm and Billy respectively) and Stefan Olsdal playing Polly Small's bassist.  Another member of the Flaming Creatures, Pearl, was played by Xavior (Paul Wilkinson), former lead singer of Romo band DexDexTer and later a keyboard player for Placebo and Rachel Stamp.

Track listing
 Brian Eno: "Needle in the Camel's Eye" (Brian Eno, Phil Manzanera) – 3:09
 Shudder to Think: "Hot One" (Nathan Larson, Shudder to Think) (Based on a lot of David Bowie's glam work, mostly "Time") – 3:04
 Placebo: "20th Century Boy" (T. Rex cover) (Marc Bolan) – 3:42
 The Venus in Furs (vocals by Thom Yorke): "2HB" (Roxy Music cover) (Bryan Ferry) – 5:39
 Wylde Ratttz (vocals by Ewan McGregor): "T.V. Eye" (The Stooges cover) (Dave Alexander, Scott Asheton, Ron Asheton, James Osterberg Jr.) – 5:24
 Shudder to Think: "Ballad of Maxwell Demon" (Based on David Bowie's "All the Young Dudes" and Brian Eno's band Maxwell Demon) (Craig Wedren, Shudder to Think) – 4:47
 Grant Lee Buffalo: "The Whole Shebang" (Based on David Bowie's "Velvet Goldmine") (Grant-Lee Phillips) – 4:11
 The Venus in Furs (vocals by Thom Yorke): "Ladytron" (Roxy Music cover) (Ferry) – 4:26
 Pulp: "We Are the Boys" (Cocker, Banks, Doyle, Steve Mackey, Webber) – 3:13
 Roxy Music: "Virginia Plain" (Ferry) – 3:00
 Teenage Fanclub & Donna Matthews: "Personality Crisis" (New York Dolls cover) (David Johansen, Johnny Thunders) – 3:49
 Lou Reed: "Satellite of Love" (Lou Reed) – 3:41
 T. Rex: "Diamond Meadows" (Bolan) – 2:00
 Paul Kimble & Andy Mackay: "Bitters End" (Ferry) – 2:13
 The Venus in Furs (vocals by Jonathan Rhys Meyers): "Baby's on Fire" (Brian Eno cover) (Eno) – 3:19
 The Venus in Furs (vocals by Thom Yorke): "Bitter-Sweet" (Roxy Music cover) (Andy Mackay, Ferry) – 4:55
 Carter Burwell: "Velvet Spacetime" (Carter Burwell) – 4:10
 The Venus in Furs (vocals by Jonathan Rhys Meyers): "Tumbling Down" (Cockney Rebel cover) (Steve Harley) – 3:28
 Steve Harley & Cockney Rebel: "Make Me Smile (Come Up and See Me)" (Harley) – 3:59

A more extensive selection of music was used for the movie soundtrack.

Film soundtrack listing
"Needle in the Camel's Eye" (Eno, Manzanera) – performed by Brian Eno
"Hot One" (Larson, Shudder to Think) – performed by Shudder to Think
"People Rockin' People" (Larson) – performed by Nathan Larson
"Avenging Annie" (Andy Pratt) – performed by Andy Pratt
"Coz I Love You" (Noddy Holder, Jim Lea) – performed by Slade
"The Fat Lady of Limbourg" (Eno) – performed by Brian Eno
"A Little of What You Fancy Does You Good" (Fred W. Leigh, George Arthurs) – performed by Lindsay Kemp
"Tutti Frutti" (Richard Penniman, Dorothy LaBostrie) – performed by The Venus in Furs, vocals by Callum Hamilton
"Do You Wanna Touch Me? (Oh Yeah!)" (Gary Glitter, Mike Leander) – performed by Gary Glitter
"Band of Gold" (Ronald Dunbar, Edythe Wayne) – performed by Freda Payne
"2HB" (Ferry) – performed by The Venus in Furs, vocals by Thom Yorke
"Sebastian" (Harley) – performed by The Venus in Furs, vocals by Jonathan Rhys Meyers
"T.V. Eye" (Alexander, S. Asheton, R. Asheton, Osterberg Jr.) – performed by Wylde Ratttz, vocals by Ewan McGregor
"Ballad of Maxwell Demon" (Wedren, Shudder to Think) – performed by Shudder to Think
"The Whole Shebang" (Phillips) – performed by Grant Lee Buffalo 
"Symphony No. 6 in A Minor" (Gustav Mahler) – performed by Czech Philharmonic Orchestra
"Get in the Groove" (James Timothy Shaw) – performed by The Mighty Hannibal
"Ladytron" (Ferry) – performed by The Venus In Furs, vocals by Thom Yorke
"We Are the Boys" (Cocker, Banks, Doyle, Mackey, Webber) – performed by Pulp
"Cosmic Dancer" (Bolan) – performed by T. Rex
"Virginia Plain" (Ferry) – performed by Roxy Music
"Personality Crisis" (Johansen, Thunders) – performed by Teenage Fanclub & Donna Matthews
"Satellite of Love" (Reed) – performed by Lou Reed
"Diamond Meadows" (Bolan) – performed by T. Rex
"Bitters End" (Ferry) – performed by Paul Kimble
"Baby's on Fire" (Eno) – performed by The Venus in Furs, vocals by Jonathan Rhys Meyers
"My Unclean" (R. Asheton, Mark Arm) – performed by Wylde Ratz, vocals by Ewan McGregor
"Bitter-Sweet" (Mackay, Ferry) – performed by The Venus in Furs, vocals by Thom Yorke
"20th Century Boy" (Bolan) – performed by Placebo
"Dead Finks Don't Talk" (Eno) -performed by Brian Eno
"Gimme Danger" (Iggy Pop, James Williamson) – performed by The Venus in Furs, vocals by Ewan McGregor
"Tumbling Down" (Harley) – performed by The Venus in Furs, vocals by Jonathan Rhys Meyers
"2HB" (Ferry) – performed by The Venus in Furs, vocals by Paul Kimble
"Make Me Smile (Come Up and See Me)" (Harley) – performed by Steve Harley & Cockney Rebel

Reception

Box office
The film opened in the United Kingdom on 23 October 1998 and grossed over $700,000. It was released in the United States on 6 November 1998 in 85 venues, grossing $301,787 in its opening weekend and ranking sixteenth at the box office, and fifth among the week's new releases. It would ultimately gross $1,053,788 in the United States and Canada and $4,313,644 worldwide.

Critical response
Velvet Goldmine received mixed to positive reviews from critics. On review aggregator website Rotten Tomatoes, the film has a 60% rating based on 47 reviews, with an average of 6.5/10. The critical consensus reads: "Velvet Goldmine takes a visual and narrative approach befitting its larger-than-life subject, although it's still disappointingly less than the sum of its parts". Metacritic reports a 65 out of 100 score based on 25 critics, indicating "generally favorable reviews".

Janet Maslin, having seen the film at the New York Film Festival, made it a "NYT Critics' Pick," calling it a "dazzlingly surreal" rock version of "Citizen Kane with an extraterrestrial Rosebud" and saying it "brilliantly reimagines the glam rock ‘70s as a brave new world of electrifying theatricality and sexual possibility, to the point where identifying precise figures in this neo-psychedelic landscape is almost beside the point. Velvet Goldmine tells a story the way operas do: blazing with exquisite yet abstract passions, and with quite a lot to look at on the side." According to Peter Travers, "Haynes creates Velvet Goldmine...with a masturbatory fervor that demands dead-on details" and "fashions a structure out of Citizen Kane"; it's a film that "works best as a feast of sight and sound,...re-creating an era as a gorgeous carnal dream,...celebrat[ing] the art of the possible." In a less enthusiastic review, Roger Ebert of the Chicago Sun-Times gave the film two out of four stars and found its plot too discursive and confusingly assorted because of how it "bogs down in the apparatus of the search for Slade" by clumsily using scenes from Citizen Kane. David Sterritt from The Christian Science Monitor wrote "The music and camera work are dazzling, and the story has solid sociological insights into a fascinating pop-culture period."

In a retrospective review, Slant Magazine'''s Jeremiah Kipp gave Velvet Goldmine four out of four stars and said that, although unsupportive critics may be "terrified of a movie with so many ideas", the film successfully shows a "melancholic ode to freedom, and those who fight for it through art", because of Haynes' detailed imagery and the cast's "expressive, soulful performances". Scott Tobias of The A.V. Club felt that Haynes' appropriation of structural elements from Citizen Kane is the film's "masterstroke", as it helps "evoke the glam rock movement without destroying the all-important mystique that sustains it." Tobias argued that, like Haynes' Bob Dylan-inspired 2007 film I'm Not There, Velvet Goldmine deals with a famously enigmatic figure indirectly through allusion and imagery, and consequently succeeds more than a simpler biopic could.

In an interview with GQ, Jonathan Rhys Meyers  critcized the decision to use a different actor to play Tommy Stone at the end of the film: "... it's very hard for the audience to get that, which I think, I'm not quite sure did we make the right move there. Because I would have preferred to play Tommy Stone myself. You would have got more of the connection."

Home media
Since its 1999 DVD release, the film has become a cult classic and has been described as having "an obsessive following among younger audiences."
Haynes said in a 2007 interview, "A film that had the hardest time, at least initially, was Velvet Goldmine, and it's the film that seems to mean the most to a lot of teenagers and young people, who are just obsessed with that movie. They're exactly who I was thinking about when I made Velvet Goldmine, but it just didn't get to them the first time around."

A Blu-ray was released in Region A on 13 December 2011, and includes a newly recorded commentary track by Haynes and Vachon. In it, Haynes thanks the fansites for helping him compile the notes for the commentary.

The soundtrack to Velvet Goldmine was released on vinyl in 2019.

Awards and nominations
 1998 Cannes Film Festival – Best Artistic Contribution – Todd Haynes; also nominated for Palme d'Or
 Academy Awards – nominated for Best Costume Design (Sandy Powell)
 BAFTA Award – Best Costume Design – Best Costume Design – Sandy Powell; nominated for Best Make Up/Hair (Peter King)
  1999 Independent Spirit Awards – Best Cinematography – Maryse Alberti; nominated for Best Director (Todd Haynes) and Best Feature
 1998 Edinburgh International Film Festival – Channel 4 Director's Award – Todd Haynes
 GLAAD Media Awards – Outstanding Film (Limited Release)

Connections to other works

 The film's title takes its name from David Bowie's song "Velvet Goldmine".
 The film's disclaimer reads "Although what you are about to see is a work of fiction, it should nevertheless be played at maximum volume," an allusion to Bowie's Ziggy Stardust album, which contains the legend: "To be played at maximum volume."
 The name of the lead character, Brian Slade, is an allusion to the 1970s glam band, Slade. Slade's persona "Maxwell Demon" was named after Brian Eno's first band, which itself was influenced by James Clerk Maxwell's thought experiment character, "Maxwell's demon".
 Wild's backing band, The Rats, shares its name with one of Mick Ronson's earliest groups. It also alludes to Iggy Pop's band, The Stooges in that both words share a similar meaning ("rat" and "stooge" both being terms for someone who is an informer).
 The scene where couples are shown walking into the Sombrero Club on New Year's Eve 1969 is similar to a shot of people entering a party from Welles' film The Magnificent Ambersons.
 Maxwell Demon's guitarist shares his name, Trevor, with Bowie's The Spiders from Mars bassist Trevor Bolder, and his last name is Finn, as T. Rex percussionist Mickey Finn.
 "Venus in Furs" is a reference to a Velvet Underground song of the same name, whose title and lyrics in turn reference a novel of that name by Leopold von Sacher-Masoch.
 Flaming Creatures is also the name of Jack Smith's seminal piece of gay cinema.
 Much of the script consists of quotations from various works of Oscar Wilde, and several of the scenes involving the character Jack Fairy reference the novels of Jean Genet.
 The bleak, dystopian feel of the action taking place in 1984 alludes to the novel Nineteen Eighty-Four by George Orwell, to Bowie's own dystopian song of the same name, and to Bowie's reinvention of himself as a mainstream entertainer during the Reagan and Thatcher era.
 The "pantomime dame" from the vaudeville troupe is played by influential dancer Lindsay Kemp, a former teacher of Bowie's who collaborated with him on several music videos, including "John, I'm Only Dancing".
 The little girl on the train is reading "Antigonish" (a poem by William Hughes Mearns), which was inspiration for David Bowie's "The Man Who Sold The World".
 Arthur Stuart's boss has mydriasis in his left eye, much like Bowie's.
 "The Ballad of Maxwell Demon" contains the lyrics: "The boys from Quadrant 44 with their vicious metal hounds never come 'round here no more," referencing Ray Bradbury's dystopian novel, Fahrenheit 451. This is likely an allusion to Bowie basing an entire album (Diamond Dogs) on the dystopian novel Nineteen Eighty-Four.
The scene near the middle of the film that portrays Slade and Wild about to make love as Barbie Dolls, pays homage to Haynes' earlier work in Superstar: The Karen Carpenter Story, which was acted out primarily with the dolls.

References

Bibliography
 

External links

 
 
 
 [ Review of Velvet Goldmine'' Original Soundtrack] from AllMusic

1998 films
1990s French-language films
1990s musical drama films
1998 LGBT-related films
British musical drama films
British independent films
British LGBT-related films
British nonlinear narrative films
American musical drama films
American independent films
American LGBT-related films
American nonlinear narrative films
American rock music films
British rock music films
Bisexuality-related films
Films about music and musicians
Films about singers
Films scored by Carter Burwell
Films directed by Todd Haynes
Films produced by Christine Vachon
Films set in the 1970s
Films set in 1974
Films set in 1984
Films set in Berlin
Films set in London
Films set in New York City
Incest in film
Punk films
Killer Films films
Film4 Productions films
Newmarket Capital Group films
1998 independent films
Cultural depictions of David Bowie
Films à clef
BAFTA winners (films)
Glam rock
Male bisexuality in film
1998 drama films
Films shot in Greater Manchester
1990s English-language films
1990s American films
1990s British films